Index of Effluency (or IOE) is the top prize awarded in the 24 Hours of LeMons automotive racing series. General criteria to win this award is a car that is too unreliable to be driven effectively on the streets yet manages to complete a decent number of laps on the race track. IOE can be awarded to a vehicle that was deemed unreliable from the factory (e.g. Volkswagen Karmann Ghia) or a more reliable car with an unwise engine transplant (e.g. Ford Thunderbird with a BMW diesel engine). The award is named after the "Index of Thermal Efficiency", a prize briefly given in LeMons' namesake the 24 Hours of Le Mans to the car that scored the highest based on a complex formula that took into account car weight, fuel usage and average speed.

Prize 

The Index of Effluency title comes with a trophy. Prior to 2010, the trophy varied in design and was often made from recycled automotive parts. Beginning in 2010, the IOE trophy was made from heavy gauge metal and is of a racer running from an inverted car. The base of the trophy is a steel silhouette of a lemon, the series' logo. Laminated to the base is a printed label of the race name and year.

Along with the fame comes a cash prize, generally paid in the form of a standard, bank issued check written by race organizer John "Jay" Lamm but occasionally paid, as is the winner on laps, in nickels. When local banks do not have enough coins in stock to pay the winner on laps, checks are drawn, but usually on a medium that makes a winner's bank deposit an embarrassing experience (i.e. a toilet seat). However, IOE winners are frequently spared this layer of ridicule.

The amount of the IOE prize has changed over the years.  In 2008 and 2009, the prize was $500.  In 2010, in order to raise the significance of the Index of Effluency over that of winning the race outright (completing the most number of laps), the IOE prize was raised to $1501, one dollar more than the then-current race-winning prize of $1500. As the prize awards for winning the race outright and/or winning different race classes have changed over time, the IOE prize has continued to be set at one dollar more than the next-highest prize amount, to emphasize the IOE's status as the highest award in LeMons.

Previous winners 
Detroit 2007: One Night Stand Endurance Team, Chevrolet Cavalier Wagon
Altamont 2007: Ecurie Ecrappe, Alfa Romeo Spider
Arse-Freeze-Apaloosa 2007: Size Matters, Plymouth Fury
Altamont 2008: Autobahn Society Racing, BMW 2002
LeMons South 2008: Tunachuckers, 1966 Volvo 122
LeMons New England 2008: Chard Beef Racing, Buick Regal
LeMons Detroit(ish) 2008: The 98ers, Oldsmobile 98
Yee-Haw It's LeMons Texas! 2008: Never Give Up, BMW 1600-2
Arse-Freeze-Apaloosa 2008: Team B210 Racing, Datsun B210
Gator-O-Rama 2009: Opular Dependence, 1972 Opel GT (with GM V6),  MSR Houston
South Spring 2009: Heavy Metal, Ford LTD
Goin' For Broken 2009: Redneck Racing, 1991 Cadillac Eldorado
Laissez Les Crapheaps Roulez 2009: LeMons of Club GP, 1997 Pontiac Grand Prix SE
New England 2009: Team UDMan-Trailing Throttle Oversteer, 1963 Chevrolet Corvair
Buttonwillow Histrionics 2009: San Diego Minis (a.k.a. Team Bean), 1962 Austin Mini
South Fall 2009: Rusty Bolt Racing, BMW 530i
The Lamest Day 2009: Total Loss Racing, 1987 AvtoVaz Lada Signet
Yee-Haw It's LeMons Texas 2009: Black Knight Racing (It's Just a Flesh Wound), Triumph TR7
Arse-Freeze-Apalooza 2009: Purple LeMons Racing, Volkswagen Beetle
Auction-Weekend Gavel-Tap GP 2010: Team Flyin' Four-Door Fortress, Oldsmobile 98 Regency Brougham
Southern Discomfort 2010: Track Pillagerz, Buick LeSabreTooth
Gator-O-Rama 2010: LRE (LeMons Racing Experiment), Datsun 240Z.
Sears Pointless 2010: Air Prance Oui-We-Can, 1971 Citroen D Super
American Irony 2010: Chicken and Waffles, Volkswagen Quantum Syncro wagon.
Cain't Get Bayou 2010: Mostly Harmless Racing, Volkswagen Karmann Ghia
Goin' For Broken 2010: Dust N Debris, Dodge Shadow
South Spring 2010: Schumacher Taxi Service: Craptation Regurgitation, Chevy Citation
North Dallas Hooptie 2010: Crewe Le Pew Redeaux, Renault Le Car
Capitol Offense 2010: Misfit Toys Racing, Wartburg 311
The B.F.E. GP 2010: Rocket Surgery Racing, Renault 4CV
LeMons New England 2010: Police Brutality, Speedycop, 1963 Ford Thunderbird Turbodiesel
The Arse-Sweat-Apalooza 2010: King Henry V8th, Cadillac Sedan de Ville
Mutually Assured Destruction of Omaha 2010: Airborne Ranger Race Team, Chevrolet Beretta
Yee-Haw It's LeMons Texas! 2010: Seven Come Eleven, Volkswagen Fastback
LeMons South Fall 2010,: Dog Ciao Racing, Alfa Romeo Spider
Detroit Bull Oil GP 2010: Scuderia Arugginito, Alfa Romeo Berlina
The Rod Blagojevich Never-Say-Die 500 2010: SpeedyCop, Toyota MR2/Lancia Scorpion
Laissez Les Crapheaps Roulez 2010: Property Devaluation Racing, Ford Fairmont wagon
LeMons Arse-Freeze-Apalooza 2010: Italian Stallions-The Blue Meanie, Fiat 600D
The Painfully Bland Bowl of Thin Lukewarm Oatmeal That Can't Possibly Offend Anyone, No Matter How Much They Enjoy Being Offended, 24-Hour Season Ender 2010: Adopted by Jets 2, Saab 96
The Real Hoopties of New Jersey 2011: Gormless Racing, 1968/73 MGB GT
American Irony 2011: Zero Budget Racing, 1982 Chevrolet Chevette Diesel
BOSTON TOW PARTY AND OVERHEAD-CAM BAKE 2011: Team Speedycop and the Gang of Outlaws, 1980 Pontiac Bonneville DONK
Yee-Haw it's Texas 2012: Team Sensory Assault, barn-find 1972 Mazda RX-2
LeMons Sears Pointless 2012: Team Oly Express, 1964 Plymouth Barracuda
LOUDON ANNOYING 2012: Team Speedycop and the Gang of Outlaws, Viking Camper - Suzuki X-90
The Arse-Sweat-Apalooza 2012: Team Tinworm, 1959 Humber Super Snipe
North Dallas Hooptie 2013: Teamgravy Racing- 1974 Porsche 914
Capitol Offense 2013: Austin Powerless Racing, 1975 Austin Marina
Button Turrible 2013: Planned Obsolescence, 1979 Buick Skyhawk 
South Fall 2013: Idle Clatter Racing, 1979 Mercedes 300SDS
Gator-O-Rama 2013: Escape Velocity Racing, 1964 Dodge Dart
HumidiTT 2014, Sebring Int'l Raceway: Team Fairlylame, 1964 Ford Fairlane
NASA, We Have a Problem 2-Hour Sprint 2014: Hella Shitty Racing - 1971 Volkswagen Super Beetle
Gator-O-Rama 2014: The Resistance, 1975 Honda Civic 1200
South Fall 2015: Idle Clatter Racing, 1982/1979 Toyocedes Hilux 300SRD
Southern Discomfort 2016: HackBerry Motorsports, 1983 Chevrolet Astro
Arse Freeze-a-Palooza 2016: Four Yak Press Racing, 1952 Willys Aero-Lark
Pacific Northworst 2017: Transcontinental Drifters - 1991 Toyota Previa
Halloween Hooptiefest 2017: Olga and the Engineers - 1987 Mercedes Benz 300E
Houston We Have a Problem 2017: Team Lowball - 1974 AMC Gremlin X
The Cure for Gingervitis 2018: Rust Belt Racing- 1977 Toyota Celica
Where the Elite Meet to Cheat 2018: Heads You Win, Tails We Lose Racing - 1994 Lincoln Mark VIII
Smells Like AMC Spirit 2018: Team Lowball - 1982 AMC Spirit
Get Yer Phil 500 2018: Salty Thunder Racing - 1986 Pontiac Fiero
Arse-Freeze-Apalooza 2018: Bodge Engineering - 1991 Sterling (marque) 827SL
'Shine Country Classic 2019: Slant Six - 1964 Plymouth Valiant Signet
Arizona D-Bags 2019: A Fist Full of Cotter Pins - 1961 Borgward Isabella Coupe
Sears Pointless @ Hooptiecon 2019, Confusingly Presented by Yokohama: Opile; A Black Iron Project. - 1967 Opel Kadett
Cain't Git Bayou 2019: Hi Hungry, I'm Dad! - 1993 Chrysler LeBaron
Doing Time in Joliet 2019: S Car Go Racing - 1989 Oldsmobile Cutlass Ciera
Rust Belt GP 2019: Team Shell Shocked - 1976 AMC Gremlin
The Pitt Maneuver 2019: Rust Cartel - 1965 Ford Fairlane
Southern Discomfort 2019: Senior Citizens Club of America - 1978 Datsun B210GX
The Minneapolis 500 2019: Unified Partnership of Pentastar Racers - 1992 Plymouth Sundance Duster 
Pacific Northworst 2020: Piston Liberation Front - 1959 Jaguar Mark 1
 The Pitt Maneuver 2021: Cheesebolt Enterprises - 1987 Ford Tempo Lx 2-Door
 The Tony Swan Never-Say-Die Memorial 2021: Lil' Enos Racing - 1994 Ford Tempo GL 4-Door
 Shine Country Classic 2022: Event Horizon - 1980 Plymouth Horizon
 Yokohama Sears Pointless 2022: Team Apathy - 1971 Honda 600
 Cain't Git Bayou 2022: Black Un_Beauty - 1977 Chrysler Imperial
 The Pitt Maneuver 2022: Pat-A-Palemons - 2000 Buick LeSabre
 Yokohama Lemons Block Party 2022: It'll Be Fine... - 1993 Eagle Summit Wagon
 Yokohama Days of Thunderhill 2022: Dirty Duck Racing - 1983 Volkswagen Rabbit
 The B. F. E. GP 2022: Skid-Do - 1981 Toyota Starlet
 Yokohama Real Hoopties of New Jersey 2022: El Chupacabra - 1989 Ford Fiesta
 The Rust Belt GP 2022: Stranger Danger and the Ruckus Rangers - 1965 Chevy Corvair
 Pacific Northworst GP 2022: Zitronen Kommando - 1999 Porsche 996
 GP Du Lac Chargoggagogg(ETC) 2022: Tunachuckers - 1966 Volvo Amazon
 Doing Time in Joliet 2022: TDISore "Racing" - 2003 Volkswagen Jetta TDI
 High Plains Drifter 2022: Why Would You Do That (Racing) - 1986 Chevy Chevette
 Lemons South Fall 2022: Test Card F - 1980 Rover SD1
 Yokohama Button Turrible 2022: Ran When Parked Racing - 1973 Chevy El Camino
 The Tony Swan Never-Say-Die Memorial 2022: Kenosha Kickers - 1968 AMC Ambassador
 Halloween Hooptiefest 2022: Flatball Racing - 1977 Lancia Scorpion
 Smells Like AMC Spirit 2022: Piston Liberation Front - 1958 Edsel Corsair

See also

 List of motor vehicle awards

References

External links 
 24 Hours of LeMons Website
 Jay describes the Index of Effluency at the LeMons South 2008 race

Motor vehicle awards